James McIlroy  (25 October 1931 – 20 August 2018) was a Northern Ireland international footballer, who played for Glentoran, Burnley, Stoke City and Oldham Athletic. He was regarded as one of Burnley's greatest players, having played 497 matches and scoring 131 goals. McIlroy also managed Oldham Athletic and Bolton Wanderers.

Career

Burnley
McIlroy was born in Lambeg, County Antrim and he was introduced to football at an early age as his father, Harry played for Lisburn Distillery and his uncle, Willie played for Portadown. After leaving school McIlroy played for Glentoran before joining Burnley in March 1950 for £7,000. He soon cemented his reputation as one of the finest scheming inside forwards since World War II. He was dubbed as the 'Brain' of Burnley and was a very composed passer of the ball only releasing it when he was sure of finding a teammate. His neat footwork made him a crowd favourite at Turf Moor and indeed for the Northern Ireland national team where he made 55 caps. He helped Burnley win the First Division in 1959–60 and reach the FA Cup Final in 1962, losing 3–1 to Tottenham Hotspur. After 497 matches for the "Clarets" scoring 131 goals, McIlory was allowed to leave for Stoke City for a cut price £25,000, which came as a shock to the Burnley fans who branded chairman Bob Lord 'insane'.

Stoke City
McIlroy joined Tony Waddington's Stoke who at the time had a collection of experienced veterans with the likes of Stanley Matthews, Dennis Viollet, Jackie Mudie and Don Ratcliffe. He arrived at Stoke with the side top of the table but his debut for Stoke was a disaster as Stoke crashed to a 6–0 defeat at Norwich City. Regardless Stoke continued their push for promotion and with McIlroy's intelligent passing featuring heavily they claimed the Second Division title in 1962–63. He scored 12 goals in 1963–64 as Stoke established themselves in the top tier, he also played in the 1964 League Cup Final as Stoke lost 4–3 Leicester City. His final match for the "Potters" was against Burnley on 27 December 1965 leaving to become manager of Oldham Athletic.

Later career
In January 1966 he moved into management after being recruited by new Oldham Athletic chairman Ken Bates. With Oldham struggling at the foot of the Third Division, Oldham paid Stoke £5,000 so that they could register McIlroy as a player again. He signed several former Stoke City team-mates, including Bill Asprey, Alan Philpott, George Kinnell and Keith Bebbington. However McIlroy did not cope well with the pressure of management and resigned after losing 4–0 against Luton Town on the opening day of the 1968–69 season. He returned to Stoke City for a short while as assistant to Waddington before moving to Bolton Wanderers as coach and assistant to Nat Lofthouse. McIlroy had an 18-day spell in charge after Lofthouse's departure but resigned after just two matches on principle after being told by the board to sell players.

After football

He retired to the Burnley area and was a regular attender of Burnley home matches. He was given Freedom of the Borough Burnley in December 2008 and was given a testimonial match by Burnley in 2009.

McIlroy was appointed Member of the Order of the British Empire (MBE) in the 2011 New Years Honours List for services to football and to charity, and arranged to receive the honour at Burnley's Turf Moor ground rather than at Buckingham Palace.

In April 2015, the feature-length documentary Spirit of '58 was screened as part of the Belfast Film Festival. It featured Jimmy McIlroy prominently alongside the other surviving players (Billy Bingham, Peter McParland, Billy Simpson and Harry Gregg) as it told the story of Northern Ireland's journey throughout the 1950s under the managership of Peter Doherty, culminating in the 1958 World Cup.

McIllroy died on 20 August 2018 at the age of 86. In a statement Burnley called him "our greatest ever player."

Jimmy McIlroy Stand
Burnley's stadium, Turf Moor, has a stand named in McIlroy's honour. The stadium's eastern stand was rebuilt in the late 1990s after the Beehole End was demolished and was named the "Jimmy McIlroy Stand".

Career statistics

Playing career
Source:

A.  The "Other" column constitutes appearances and goals in the European Cup and FA Charity Shield.

Managerial career

International
Source:

International goals

Scores and results list Northern Ireland's goal tally first.

Honours
 Burnley
 First Division champions: 1959–60
 FA Cup runner-up: 1962

 Stoke City
 Second Division champions: 1962–63

References

1931 births
2018 deaths
Bolton Wanderers F.C. managers
Burnley F.C. players
1958 FIFA World Cup players
Glentoran F.C. players
Northern Ireland international footballers
Football managers from Northern Ireland
Association footballers from Northern Ireland
Oldham Athletic A.F.C. managers
People from County Antrim
Stoke City F.C. players
Members of the Order of the British Empire
English Football Hall of Fame inductees
English Football League players
English Football League representative players
Association football forwards
English Football League managers
FA Cup Final players